Barnes-Wellford House is a historic home located at Charleston, West Virginia, United States.  It was designed in the 1920s by English-born architect Fred Crowthers for Bernard Barnes, a leading Charleston businessman.  The cottage size home is in the English Tudor style.

It was listed on the National Register of Historic Places in 1984 as part of the South Hills Multiple Resource Area.

References

External links
 National Register of Historic Places Inventory Nomination Form

English-American culture in West Virginia
Houses in Charleston, West Virginia
Houses completed in 1923
Houses on the National Register of Historic Places in West Virginia
National Register of Historic Places in Charleston, West Virginia
Tudor Revival architecture in West Virginia